Los Ángeles Azules are a Mexican musical group that plays the cumbia sonidera genre, which is a cumbia subgenre using the accordion and synthesizers. This results in a fusion of the sounds of cumbia from the 1950-1970s with those of 1990s-style electronic music.

History
The group got together in 1976, but started officially in 1980. It was formed by the siblings of the Mejía Avante family: Elías, Alfredo, José Hilario, Jorge, Cristina and Guadalupe.

The group went through various periods of popularity and various styles. In 1997, they had a huge hit with Cómo Te Voy a Olvidar, re-recorded many hits with guest vocalists including Carla Morrison, Lila Downs, and Ximena Sariñana in 2013. In 2014, they launched a new musical genre cumbia sinfónica as they performed their greatest contemporary hits with the Mexico City Symphony Orchestra. Their subsequent album Cómo Te Voy a Olvidar Edición de Súper Lujo reached #5 on the Mexican regional music charts.

In 2016, they issued De Plaza En Plaza, which features collaborations with Mexican artist Gloria Trevi, Yuri, Natalia Lafourcade, Spanish musician Miguel Bosé, American duo Ha*Ash, among others. The first single from the album was "La Cumbia del Infinito" with Natalia Lafourcade and Rodrigo & Gabriela; released on June 3, 2016. The second single "Mi Niña Mujer" with Ha*Ash was released on August 5, 2016. The same year they recorded their twenty-seventh album Esto Sí Es Cumbia.

The album was officially released in June 2018, under the OCESA Seitrack. Esto Sí Es Cumbia consists entirely of cover songs. Included interpretations of "Nunca Es Suficiente" with Natalia Lafourcade, "Me Cuesta Tanto Olvidarte" with Ana Torroja, "Perdón, Perdón" with Ha*Ash, "El Amor Después del Amor" with Fito Paéz, among others. In 2018, they played on the Coachella Stage at the Coachella Valley Music and Arts Festival, making it the first time a traditional cumbia group has played at the popular festival.

Discography 

Studio Albums
Ritmo... Alegría... Sabor!, Vol. 1  (1982)
Los Ángeles Azules, Vol. 2 (1983)
Los Ángeles Azules, Vol. 3 (1984)
Cumbia de la Tostadita, Vol. 4 (1985)
Cumbia de las Chispitas, Vol. 5 (1987)
Los Ángeles Azules, Vol. 6 (1988)
Y Valió La Pena Esperar, Vol. 7 (1989)
Y Esta... Si Es Cumbia, Vol. 8 (1991)(Last álbum recorded at Discos Pearless)
Entrega de Amor (1993)Disa
Sin Pecado (1995)
Inolvidables/Como Te Voy A Olvidar (1996)
Confesiones[El Grupo Tropical De La Década] (1998)
Una Lluvia De Rosas (1999)
Alas Al Mundo (2002)
Nunca Te Olvidaré (2004)
Interpretan Éxitos de Juan Gabriel (2006)(Last álbum recorded at Disa)
Tu Juguete (2007) Musart/Balboa Records
A Ritmo De Cumbia/Iztapalapa Te Quiero  (2012)
Cómo Te Voy a Olvidar (2013) OCESA Seitrack, Sony Music
Viernes Cultural (2014) OCESA Seitrack
De Plaza En Plaza (2016) OCESA Seitrack
Esto Sí Es Cumbia (2018)OCESA Seitrack
De Buenos Aires Para El Mundo (2020) OCESA Seitrack, Sony Music

Direct Albums
En Vivo, Azul Vivo (2002) Disa
 En Vivo, Gira2005 (2005) (DVD) Disa
En Vivo Desde Phoenix.(2020)Sony Music(Only available on digital download)

EP Albums
 Dance Mixes (1997)(Remixes Album). Disa

Compilations
15 Hits (1995)Discos Pearles
12 Éxitos Instrumentales (1995)Disa
15 Exitos de Colección (1996)Discos Pesrles
Mis Primeros 15 Exitos de Colección (1997).Disa
Frente A Frente(Los Recatadores De La Cumbia)./Con Rayito Colombiano.(2000)Emi Latín/Disa(Only available in US)
Grandes Éxitos. (2001).Leader Music/Disa(Only available in Argentina)
Historia Musical-30 Pegaditas.(2001)Disa
Encuentro De Ángeles Volumen 01/Con Los Ángeles De Charly . (2003) Disa/Fonovisa
Top 10.(2004)Disa
Grandes Exitos:Remezclados y Remasterizados.(2005)Disa/Universal
Encuentro De Ángeles Volumen 02/Con Los Ángeles De Charly . (2006) Disa/Fonovisa20 Reales Super Exitos.(2007)Disa/UniversalOro Grupero/(con Los Ángeles De Charly).(2008) UMG Records/Universal Music Distribution. (Only available in US).Serie 33:Mi Niña Mujer(2009)Disa/UniversalColección Privada: Las 20 Exclusivas [Edición limitada](2009)Disa/Universal15 Exitos(2010)Disa/Universal20 Kilates(2012)Disa/UniversalIconos 25 Exitos(2012).Disa/UniversalBasico & Elemental.[2CDS+DVD](2013).Disa/UniversalGrandes Éxitos De (2013)(Only available on digital download)Independent record21 Black Jack:Nueva Edición remasterizada.(2013)Disa/UniversalImprescindibles(2014)Disa/UniversalGran Encuentro (20 Éxitos Originales)/(con Los Ángeles de Charly).(2014) UMG Records/Universal Music Distribution. (Only available in US).20 Éxitos Historia Musical(2015)Discos CristalPachangon Sonidero(2015)Universal Music Distribution/UMG RecordsDuelo De Angeles./Con Los Angeles Negros.(2015)Universal Music MéxicoSingles.(2016)(Only available on digital download).Universal Music Distribution/UMG RecordsComo Te Voy A Olvidar(Baile Total).(Only available on digital download) (2017).Universal Music Distribution/UMG RecordsVisión 20.20 Exitos.(2017).Universal Music Distribution/UMG RecordsLos Príncipes De México.(Only available on digital download)(2017).D&O RecordsLos Príncipes De La Cumbia en Mexico'' (Only available on digital download)(2019).Esongs Entreteinment

References

External links
https://www.losangelesazules.com.mx/

Mexican musical groups
Mexican cumbia musical groups
Musical groups established in 1983
Musical groups from Mexico City
Universal Music Latin Entertainment artists